The Blakney Creek, a mostlyperennial river that is part of the Lachlan sub-catchment of the Murrumbidgee catchment within the Murray–Darling basin, is located in the South West Slopes region of New South Wales, Australia.

Course and features 
The Blakney Creek (technically a river) rises north northeast of the Yass Junction, on the south western slopes of the Great Dividing Range, and flows generally northeast before reaching its confluence with the Lachlan River near Tarcoola. The creek descends  over its  course.

See also 

 List of rivers of New South Wales (A-K)
 Rivers of New South Wales

References

External links
 

Tributaries of the Lachlan River
Rivers of New South Wales